Kristy Cox is an Australian country singer-songwriter. Cox relocated to USA in 2013.

As of 2022, Cox has released 8 studio albums and has won five golden guitars at the Country Music Awards of Australia. She was also named Australian Country Music Independent Artist of the Year off the back of her third album, Living for the Moment.

Career
Kristy Cox began singing at 11. She worked the festival circuit and released the EP Twisted Heart in 2001 and My Affections in 2003.

In 2004, Cox graduated from the CMAA Australian College of Country Music, after being awarded a scholarship. In 2005, Cox made the 2005 Starmaker Grand Final and opened for Kasey Chambers, Beccy Cole, Jedd Hughes and Jake Nickolai.

Cox released her debut studio album From My Eyes in 2006 which contained nine original songs.

It was the subsequent four song EP Fallen, recorded in Nashville and produced by award winning Mark Thornton which saw the transition to bluegrass influences.

Cox released her second studio album Breaking New Ground in 2010. It was recorded at Country Q Studio in Nashville, with guests Bryan Sutton, Randy Kohrs and Alecia Nugent.

In February 2014, Cox released her fourth studio album Living for the Moment and first on Pisgah Ridge records. It featured Mike Bub, Stephen Mougin, Darren Nicholson, Steve Sutton, David Johnson and Jerry Salley.

In 2015 Cox was selected as an official showcase artist for the International Bluegrass Music Association (IBMA).

In April 2016, Cox released her fifth studio album, Part of Me. Good Morning Country reviewed the album saying "Kristy's second release for Pisgah Ridge Records is packed with emotional songs sung from the heart, and delivered by a true vocal powerhouse."

Cox's sixth studio album Ricochet was released in April 2018. The title track and album's first single peaked inside the Bluegrass Today's Top 10 Songs. The album debuted at number 1 on the Billboard Bluegrass album chart.

In February 2020, Cox released her seventh studio album No Headlights. The album debuted at number 2 on the Billboard Bluegrass album chart.

In August 2021, Cox released "Person of the Year", the lead single from her eighth studio album. About the song, Cox said "'Person of the Year' is such a special song that pays tribute to nurses and doctors who work tirelessly to save others. The last 18 months have been especially hard on them." Shades of Blue was released in February 2022.

Discography

Studio albums

Awards and nominations

Country Music Awards of Australia
The Country Music Awards of Australia is an annual awards night held in January during the Tamworth Country Music Festival. Celebrating recording excellence in the Australian country music industry. They commenced in 1973.

! 
|-
| 2015
| "One Heartbreak Away"
| Bluegrass Recording of the Year
| 
|
|-
| rowspan="3"|  2017
| "Another Weary Mile"
| Bluegrass Recording of the Year
| 
| rowspan="3"| 
|-
| (unknown)
| (unknown)
| 
|-
| (unknown)
| (unknown)
| 
|-
| rowspan="2"| 2019
| Kristy Cox
| Female Artist of the Year
| 
| rowspan="2"| 
|-
| "Ricochet"
| Bluegrass Recording of the Year
| 
|-
| 2020
| "Yesterday’s Heartache"
| Bluegrass Recording of the Year
| 
| 
|-
| rowspan="3"| 2021
| "Finger Picking Good" (featuring Tommy Emmanuel)
| Bluegrass Recording of the Year
| 
| rowspan="3"| 
|-
| No Headlights
| Traditional Album of the Year
| 
|-
| Kirsty Cox
| Female Artist of the Year
| 
|-
| rowspan="2"|  2022
| (unknown)
| (unknown)
| 
| rowspan="2"| 
|-
| (unknown)
| (unknown)
| 
|-
|rowspan="2"| 2023 || "Good Morning Moon" || Bluegrass Recording of the Year || || rowspan=" 2"| 
|-
| Shades of Blue || Traditional Country Album of the Year || 
|-

References

21st-century Australian singers
Australian singer-songwriters
Living people
Australian country singers
Australian women singers
Year of birth missing (living people)